Kalgah-e Sofla (also Romanized as Kalgāh-e Soflá; also known as Gol Kāh-e Pā’īn and Kalgāh-e Pā’īn) is a village in Bakesh-e Do Rural District, in the Central District of Mamasani County, Fars Province, Iran. At the 2006 census, its population was 170, in 35 families.

References 

Populated places in Mamasani County